Julian Rossi (born 12 February 1942) is an Australian boxer. He competed in the men's light welterweight event at the 1964 Summer Olympics.

References

1942 births
Living people
Australian male boxers
Olympic boxers of Australia
Boxers at the 1964 Summer Olympics
Place of birth missing (living people)
Light-welterweight boxers